Scarlatti is an Italian surname. Notable people with this surname include:

Scarlatti family of 17th- and 18th-century Italy, which includes: 
Alessandro Scarlatti (1660–1725), Baroque composer known for operas and chamber cantatas, father of Domenico Scarlatti
Francesco Scarlatti (1666–1741), Baroque composer and musician, brother of Alessandro Scarlatti
Domenico Scarlatti (1685–1757), Baroque composer, influential in the development of keyboard music, son of Alessandro Scarlatti
Giuseppe Scarlatti (1718/1723–1777), Baroque composer, nephew of Alessandro or Domenico
Pietro Filippo Scarlatti (1679–1750), Baroque composer, organist and choirmaster, son of Alessandro Scarlatti
Rosa Scarlatti (1727–1775), Italian opera singer, niece of Alessandro or Domenico
Giorgio Scarlatti (1921–1990), Italian Formula One driver

See also
The Scarlatti Inheritance, novel by Robert Ludlum
 6480 Scarlatti, asteroid
 Scarlatti (crater), impact crater on Mercury
 Scarlatti Peak, in Alexander Island, Antarctica

Italian-language surnames